Dropbear, drop bear or dropbears may refer to:

 Drop bear, a fictitious Australian animal
 The Dropbears, an Australian band
 Dropbear (software), an SSH (Secure Shell) software package